The WNBA on NBC is the branding used for presentations of Women's National Basketball Association (WNBA) games produced NBC Sports and broadcast on the NBC television network in the United States. 

NBC showed Women's National Basketball Association games from 1997 to 2002 as part of their NBA on NBC coverage before the league transferred the rights to ABC/ESPN.

Background 
On June 27, 1996, NBC Sports was announced as the WNBA's first national broadcaster. The WNBA soon, also had television deals in place with the Walt Disney Company and Hearst Corporation joint venture channels, ESPN and Lifetime Television Network, respectively. At the time, NBC didn't pay television rights fees to the league's teams.

NBC nationally televised the very first WNBA game on June 21, 1997. The game featured the New York Liberty facing the Los Angeles Sparks in Los Angeles. For NBC's final season with the WNBA in 2002, they again began their season's worth of coverage on Memorial Day weekend with the Liberty and Sparks. NBC would proceed to televise WNBA games on Saturday and Sunday afternoons culminating in the Championship game on August 30.

Music and segments 
A more rock-oriented variant of John Tesh's theme, "Roundball Rock" introduced by NBC to coincide with the debut of the WNBA. NBC's halftime report was sponsored by Lee Jeans.

Ratings 
NBC Sports' broadcast of the inaugural WNBA game between the Liberty and Sparks received a 3.8 overnight national rating. Although NBC's end-of-season average for 1999 was even with 1998's average, viewership had actually increased from 1,540,000 households in 1998 to 1,607,000 in 1999. On the same token however, Nielsen ratings for NBC broadcasts of WNBA games slipped from 2 million households reached in 1997—the WNBA's inaugural season—to 1.5 million in 1999.

The average rating for the first 9 of the 10 WNBA games NBC carried in the 2001 season was only 1.1, compared to a 2.0 rating its first season.

WNBA Finals coverage 

The very first WNBA season concluded with what was at the time, a single championship game. The following year, the finale series into a best-of-three games series, with NBC airing the first two games and ESPN airing the decisive third game. In 1999, ESPN aired the first game of the championship series while NBC covered the following two. Come the year 2000, Lifetime temporarily assumed ESPN's role as the WNBA's cable outlet for the WNBA Championship. Like the year prior, Lifetime broadcast the first game while NBC covered the second and ultimately decisive game between the Houston Comets and New York Liberty. This marked Houston's fourth consecutive WNBA Championship.

ESPN returned to the fold in the year 2001, broadcasting the first game with NBC airing the second and decisive game between the Los Angeles Sparks and Charlotte Sting. For NBC's final year of coverage in 2002, ESPN2 this time, broadcast the first game with NBC again covering what would become the second and ultimately decisive game. The Los Angeles Sparks' 69–66 victory over the New York Liberty on August 31, 2002, would therefore, prove to be the final broadcast of the WNBA on NBC.

Announcers 

During the WNBA's first season on NBC, the primary announcing team consisted of Hannah Storm calling the play-by-play with Ann Meyers doing the color commentary and Lisa Malosky assuming the role as sideline reporter. The following year, Storm receded her lead play-by-play duties to Tom Hammond, who would call NBC's coverage of the WNBA Finals with Ann Meyers in 1998 and in 2000. For the 1999 season and 2001 seasons, NBC used Mike Breen as their primary play-by-play announcer. For the WNBA's final season in 2002, Paul Sunderland worked with Meyers for their coverage of the WNBA Finals.

 Bruce Beck (sideline reporter)
 Mike Breen (play-by-play)
 Tom Hammond (play-by-play)
 Dan Hicks (studio host)
 Marion Jones (sideline reporter)
 Andrea Joyce (sideline reporter)
 Ann Meyers (color commentary)
 Lisa Malosky (sideline reporter)
 Ahmad Rashad (studio host)
 Summer Sanders (sideline reporter)
 Beth Ruyak (studio host)
 Hannah Storm (play-by-play, studio host)
 Paul Sunderland (play-by-play)
 Chris Wragge (sideline reporter, studio host)

References

External links

1997 American television series debuts
2002 American television series endings
1990s American television series
2000s American television series
Basketball on NBC
NBC
English-language television shows
NBC original programming